The Penan bulbul (Alophoixus ruficrissus) is a species of songbird in the bulbul family, Pycnonotidae. It is found  Borneo. It is usually found in the mid-storey of broad-leaved evergreen and rainforests up to 1500 metres elevation.

Subspecies 
Three subspecies are recognized:
 A. r. fowleri - (Amadon & Harrisson, 1957): Found in montane areas of Borneo, except Sabah
 A. r. meratusensis - Shakya et al., 2020: Found in mountains of south-eastern Borneo (Kalimantan)
 A. r. ruficrissus - (Sharpe, 1879): Found in mountains of north-eastern Borneo (Sabah)

References

Penan bulbul
Penan bulbul